Likawage is an administrative ward in Kilwa District of Lindi Region in Tanzania. 
According to the 2012 census, the ward has a total population of 10,434. The ward seat is Likawage village.

References

Wards of Kilwa District
Wards of Lindi Region